Facundo Gambandé (born January 10, 1990, Córdoba, Argentina), is an Argentine actor and singer. He is known for playing the role of Maxi on the Disney Channel telenovela Violetta.

Career 
His career started in 2011 with the role of Maximiliano "Maxi" Ponte, on the telenovela Violetta. He played the role on all three seasons. 

He has also participated in the four albums that the series launched: Violetta, Cantar es lo que soy, Hoy somos más and Violetta en vivo.

In 2013 he starred alongside his Violetta castmates, in the Violetta en vivo Latin American and European tour.

Personal life 
Gambandé is openly gay.

Filmography

Discography 
Soundtracks
2012: Violetta
2012: Cantar es lo que soy 
2013: Hoy somos más 
2013: Violetta en vivo
2014: Gira mi cancion
2015: Crecimos Juntos

References 

Argentine male actors
21st-century Argentine male singers
Living people
Argentine gay actors
Argentine gay musicians
Argentine LGBT singers
Gay singers
1990 births